Saulsville is a township near Atteridgeville in the City of Tshwane in the Gauteng province of South Africa.

References

Populated places in the City of Tshwane
Townships in Gauteng